Francisco Javier Castillejo Rodríguez (born 22 March 1968), commonly known as Javier Castillejo, is a Spanish former professional boxer who competed from 1988 to 2009. He held multiple world championships in two weight classes, including the WBC and lineal light-middleweight titles from 1999 to 2001, the WBC light-middleweight title again in 2005, and the WBA middleweight title from 2006 to 2007. At regional level he held the European light-middleweight title twice between 1994 and 1998, and the European Union middleweight title in 2002.

Professional career 
Castillejo made his professional debut on 22 July 1988, when he outpointed Ángel Díez over six rounds in Madrid. He had an immediate rematch with Díez, on 2 September of the same year. Their second fight resulted in Castillejo's first knockout win, when he beat Diez in the fourth round. On 4 November, he had his first fight outside Madrid, and his first knockout win in the first round, when he beat Juan Perez in Torrejón.

Castillejo had four more wins, before he was defeated for the first time. On 19 August 1989, he lost an eight-round decision to Del Bryan, in Benidorm. But he followed that loss with a streak of twenty two victories in a row.

Among the most notable wins during that streak were a fourth-round knockout on 19 October 1990, of Alfonzo Redondo, which gave Castillejo the Spanish Welterweight Championship, at Leganés. On 5 July 1991, he retained that national championship, with another fourth-round knockout victory, this time against Domingo Sanchez, in Lugo. On 10 April 1992, Castillejo got his first win when he knocked out former IBF lightweight champion, Puerto Rican Harry Arroyo, in three rounds at Leganes. He followed that victory with another win against former WBC light welterweight champion Saoul Mamby of Jamaica, by an eight-round decision on 15 May, at Bilbao. On 12 December of that year, Castillejo added the WBC's Mundo Hispano light middleweight title, when he defeated Enrique Areco by a twelve-round decision in Oviedo.

First title shot 
Despite the fact that he had not fought outside Spain as a professional yet and thus he had little international fan recognition as a boxer, Castillejo received his first world title try, when he challenged Julio César Vásquez of Argentina, for Vazquez's WBA light middleweight title, on 24 April 1993, also in Leganes. Vazquez outpointed him over 12 rounds, ending his 22 fight winning streak.

After defending his Mundo Hispano regional title with success in a rematch with Victor Hugo Sclarandi on 29 October of that year by a knockout in five rounds, Castillejo finally had his first fight abroad when he beat Bernard Razzano by a knockout in six rounds, at Dijon, France, to conquer the European light middleweight title. He defended the title successfully four times, then lost it, on 3 January 1995 to the then WBA light middleweight champion Laurent Boudouani, in Épernay, France, by knockout in the ninth round.

His next fight was a victory by disqualification in six rounds on 14 July against Carlos Rocha Tovar in Seville. The victory against Tovar was followed by a rematch with Boudouani, who would once again defeat Castillejo, this time around by a twelve-round decision, at Levallois, 6 January 1996.

Castillejo then won six more fights in a row before fighting for a world title again. He regained the EBU light middleweight title by knocking out the former WBA welterweight title challenger, Ahmed Dottuev, in round twelve at Suffolk, England, on 2 July 1998.

First world title 
On 29 January 1999, Castillejo got his second chance at becoming a world champion. He outpointed Lineal and WBC light middleweight champion Keith Mullings over twelve rounds to join a handful of world champions to come from Spain. Despite some protests from Mullings' management team, the judges' decision remained, and Castillejo held the WBC title.

Losing the title to De La Hoya 
After five defenses, where Castillejo retained the title, a fight was set between him and Oscar De La Hoya. It was Castillejo's first big time, Pay Per View event. Many fans, perhaps ignoring Castillejo's achievements in Europe and as defendind world champion, regarded Castillejo as another stepping stone in De La Hoya's career. Castillejo commented to this regard, saying on a press conference before the fight, which was held in Las Vegas, that "(he) didn't come to Las Vegas to do tourism, but to defend (his) title". Castillejo lasted the twelve round distance with De La Hoya, but was sent to the canvas seconds before the fight ended, and lost a unanimous twelve-round decision and his world title, on 23 June 2001.

After six months, Castillejo returned to the boxing ring, beating the well regarded Xavier Moya by a knockout in five rounds, On 11 January 2002, to win the vacant European Community's Junior Middleweight title, in Barcelona.

On 12 July 2002, he partially regained the WBC light middleweight title, when he beat Roman Karmazin by a twelve-round unanimous decision in Madrid, for the WBC's "Interim" title. This interim recognition was later retired from him, however, because he did not fight the WBC's recognized champion, which at the time was Shane Mosley, who had suffered an injury and was unable to box for the period being.

Castillejo then won four fights in a row, all by knockout.

He fought Fernando Vargas, in a fight that was supposed to be for the WBA's vacant light middleweight title, on 20 August 2005, in Chicago. It was decided ultimately to make the bout a ten-round affair instead of a world championship fight. Despite being dropped in round three, Castillejo was able to last ten rounds with fellow former world light middleweight champion Vargas, but he lost a ten-round decision to the Mexican-American.

Winning a middleweight title 
On 15 July 2006, Castillejo sprang back on the boxing scene by defeating younger Felix Sturm of Germany to seize the WBA middleweight belt in an exciting fight. Sturm, making his first title defense, was headed to a one-sided win until Castillejo (61–6, 41 knockouts) caught him with a left hook against the ropes with 13 seconds left in the 10th Round.

Castillejo, then hit Sturm (27–2, 11 knockouts) with three uppercuts before the referee called the fight, making Castillejo, 38 at the time of his upset victory, the oldest man to win a recognized version on the World Middleweight Championship. He lost his title in his first defence against Argentine Mariano Natalio Carrera via a disputed 11th-round TKO. Later on, Carrera tested positive for Clenbuterol and was suspended for 6 months by the WBA, thus Castillejo regained his title on 23 February. . He lost the title 28 April 2007 in a rematch against Felix Sturm.
He fought Mariano Natalio Carrera again on 13 November 2007, this time winning by KO in the 6th round.

Professional boxing record

Pay-per-view bouts

See also
List of light-middleweight boxing champions
List of middleweight boxing champions
List of WBA world champions
List of WBC world champions
List of European Boxing Union light-middleweight champions

References

External links

Javier Francisco Castillejo profile at Cyber Boxing Zone

1968 births
Sportspeople from Madrid
Living people
World Boxing Association champions
World middleweight boxing champions
Spanish male boxers
World light-middleweight boxing champions
World Boxing Council champions
European Boxing Union champions
Welterweight boxers
People from Parla
Sportspeople from the Community of Madrid